Yuri Vladimirovich Tolubeyev (May 1, 1906, St. Petersburg, Russian Empire - December 28, 1979, Leningrad, USSR) was a Soviet theatrical and cinema actor. People's Artist of the USSR (1956). Winner of the Lenin (1959) and Stalin Prize (1947). Hero of the Socialist Labour (1976).

His son, Andrei Tolubeyev, also became an actor.

Partial filmography 

 Sovershennoletiye (1935) - seaman Andrey
 Na otdykhe (1936) - Lebedev
 The Return of Maxim (1937) - Loudmouthed Worker in Natasha's Office
 Shakhtery (1937) - Vasiliy Ivanovich Chub
 Tayga zolotaya (1937)
 Doch rodiny (1937) - Chairman of the meeting
 Shakhtyory (1937)
 Professor Mamlock (1938) - Fritz
 The Vyborg Side (1939) - Yegor Bugai
 Doktor Kalyuzhnyy (1939)
 Patriot (1939) - Grigori Novikov
 The Girl from Leningrad (1941) - Maj. Braginsky
 Prints i nishchiy (1943) - Henry VIII of England
 The Turning Point (1945) - Lavrov
 Simple People (1945) - Yeryomin, works director
 Ostrov Bezymyannyy (1946) - Nikolay Krasinskiy
 Aleksandr Popov (1949) - Petrushevsky
 Konstantin Zaslonov (1949) - sekretar TsK KP Belorussii
 The Battle of Stalingrad (1949) - Andrey Aleksandrovich Zhdanov
 Velikaya sila (1950) - Abuladze
 The Inspector-General (1952) - Mayor Anton Antonovich Skvoznik-Dmukhanovsky
 Belinsky (1953) - Schepkin
 Chest tovarishcha (1953) - general Pashkov
 Les (1953)
 Unfinished Story (1955) - Nikolai Sladkov
 Don Quixote (1957) - Sancho Panza
 Den pervyy (1958) - Lomovoy izvoznik
 The Overcoat (1959) - Petrovich
 Gorizont (1962)
 Hamlet (1964) - Polonius
 Avariya (1965) - Anton Afanasyevich Pilipenko - sledovatel iz Gorskoy prokuratury
 His name was Robert (1967) - Inspector
 Chronicles of a Dive Bomber (1968) - Kuzmich, air mechanic
 Udar! Eshchyo udar! (1968) - Professor Vakhramov
 Interventsiya (1968)
 Nochnaya smena (1971) - Pavel Yegorovich Ponomaryov
 Property of the Republic (1972) - Prokofiy Dobrovo
 Pyataya chetvert (1972) - Kondrykov
 Mechenyy atom (1973) - Sergey Konstantinovich
 Front Beyond the Front Line (1978) - Professor Belyaev (final film role)

References

External links

Soviet male film actors
1906 births
1979 deaths
Heroes of Socialist Labour
Recipients of the Order of Lenin
People's Artists of the USSR
People's Artists of the RSFSR
Lenin Prize winners
Stalin Prize winners